Cécile Aubry (3 August 1928 – 19 July 2010) was a French film actress, author, television screenwriter and director.

Life and career
Born Anne-José Madeleine Henriette Bénard, Aubry began her career as a dancer. At age 20, she was signed to 20th Century Fox. She made her break as the star of Henri-Georges Clouzot's Manon (1949), which won the Golden Lion of Saint Mark at the Venice Film Festival. That brought her a leading role alongside Tyrone Power and Orson Welles in American director Henry Hathaway's feature The Black Rose (1950). Aubry had also a strong performance in Christian-Jacque's Bluebeard (1952), one of the first French-produced films to be made in color. For a short time, she was a Hollywood success, signing a lucrative contract with Fox, employing her parents as a publicity team, and regularly appearing in French film magazines as an example of the perfect hybrid of Franco-American femininity.

Aubry had a short film career. It was interrupted by a secret six-year marriage to Si Brahim El Glaoui, the eldest son of Thami El Glaoui, the Pasha of Marrakesh, whom she met in 1950 while filming The Black Rose. They had one child together, son Mehdi El Glaoui (born 1956), before their divorce. She announced her retirement from film in 1959, claiming that she had only enjoyed cinema for its travel opportunities. Aubry went on to write children's books and scenarios for children's television with considerable success.

Aubry became known in France for her television series for children, Poly, about a Shetland pony and a boy, and Belle and Sebastian, about a Pyrenean Mountain Dog and a boy, adapted for television from her books. The main character in each series was played by her son, Mehdi El Glaoui (credited as "Mehdi").

Death
On 19 July 2010, Aubry died from lung cancer in Dourdan (Essonne), France, aged 81.

Filmography

References

External links
 
 
 
Cecile Aubry on the cover of Life magazine June 26 1950 issue

1928 births
2010 deaths
Writers from Paris
French film actresses
Actresses from Paris
Deaths from lung cancer in France
French children's writers
French television writers
20th-century French actresses
20th-century French non-fiction writers
French women children's writers
20th-century French women writers
Women television writers